The geometric moray (Gymnothorax griseus)
is a moray eel of the family Muraenidae found throughout the western Indian Ocean at depths to 40 m.  Its length is up to 65 cm. It is parasitized by Ichthyoxenus puhi, a species of isopod. 

The fish is generally pale purple or greyish in colour, with a brownish head with distinct lines of black dots.

References

External links
 

geometric moray
Fish of the Red Sea
Marine fauna of East Africa
geometric moray